Dark is an album by experimental music group Hwyl Nofio, released in 2012. Dark explores a landscape steeped in Parry's own personal experience, inspired by walking through his home region of South Wales with a camera and field recorder in hand. Parry provides tangible evidence of this landscape in an accompanying book that introduces the listener to a world of chilling folk myths and the resonances of his own family histories, as well as timely references to the forgotten legacies of local artists/writers.

Track listing
"Dusk"
"Gone"
"Black Rain"
"Requiem for the Lost"
"On the Black Hill"
"The Swamp Where Alders Grow"
"Dark"
"Herbert the Steelroller"
"Anticlock"
"Old Crow"
"Fairy Folk Funeral"
"In That Moment"

Personnel
Steve Parry: Electric  guitars, prepared violin, piano, harmonium, church organ, bass, percussion 
 Mark Beazley: Bass, treatments
Steve Parry:Art Direction/Photography
Steve Parry:Composer

References

External links
https://web.archive.org/web/20130914121211/http://www.hwylnofio.com/index.html

Hwyl Nofio albums
2012 albums